Tegostoma mossulalis is a moth in the family Crambidae. It was described by Hans Georg Amsel in 1949 and is found in Iraq.

References

Odontiini
Moths described in 1949
Moths of Asia
Taxa named by Hans Georg Amsel